A quarter note (American) or crotchet (British) is a musical note played for one quarter of the duration of a whole note (or semibreve). Quarter notes are notated with a filled-in oval note head and a straight, flagless stem. The stem usually points upwards if it is below the middle line of the staff, and downwards if it is on or above the middle line. An upward stem is placed on the right side of the notehead, a downward stem is placed on the left (see image). The Unicode symbol is U+2669 (♩).

A quarter rest (or crotchet rest) denotes a silence of the same duration as a quarter note. It typically appears as the symbol , or occasionally, as the older symbol .

History

The quarter note is played for half the length of a half note and twice that of an eighth note.
The term "quarter note" is a calque (loan translation) of the German term . The names of this note (and rest) in many other languages are calqued from the same source; Romance languages usually use a term derived from the Latin    meaning 'black':

The Bulgarian, Chinese, Croatian, Czech, Japanese, Korean, Norwegian, Polish, Russian, Serbian and Slovak names mean "quarter" (for the note) and "quarter's pause" (for the rest).

See also  
 List of musical symbols

Notes

References 

Note values